Kim Ki-sung ( born May 14, 1985) is a South Korean professional ice hockey left winger. He is currently a free agent having last played for Anyang Halla of Asia League Ice Hockey (ALIH). Ki-sung was voted the "Young guy of the year "(Rookie of the year) in his first season in Asia League Ice Hockey.

References

External links

1985 births
HL Anyang players
Asian Games bronze medalists for South Korea
Asian Games medalists in ice hockey
Asian Games silver medalists for South Korea
Ice hockey players at the 2007 Asian Winter Games
Ice hockey players at the 2011 Asian Winter Games
Ice hockey players at the 2017 Asian Winter Games
Ice hockey players at the 2018 Winter Olympics
Ice hockey people from Seoul
Living people
Medalists at the 2007 Asian Winter Games
Medalists at the 2011 Asian Winter Games
Medalists at the 2017 Asian Winter Games
Olympic ice hockey players of South Korea
South Korean ice hockey left wingers
Tulsa Oilers (1992–present) players